Bindu is a village in the Gorubathan CD block in the Kalimpong subdivision of the Kalimpong district in West Bengal, India. Bindu lies in the Indo-Bhutan border, India's second oldest dam is situated at Bindu on River Jaldhaka. It is located 85 km from Jalpaiguri city.

Geography

Location

Area overview
The map alongside shows the Kalimpong Sadar subdivision of Kalimpong district. This region is characterized by abruptly rising hills and numerous small streams. It is a predominantly rural area with 77.67% of the population living in rural areas and only 22.23% living in the urban areas. While Kalimpong is the only municipality, Dungra is the sole census town in the entire area. The economy is agro-based and there are 6 tea gardens in the Gorubathan CD block. In 2011, Kalimpong subdivision had a literacy rate of 81.85%, comparable with the highest levels of literacy in the districts of the state. While the first degree college in the subdivision was established at Kalimpong in 1962 the entire subdivision (and now the entire district), other than the head-quarters, had to wait till as late as 2015 (more than half a century) to have their first degree colleges at Pedong and Gorubathan.

Note: The map alongside presents some of the notable locations in the subdivision. All places marked in the map are linked in the larger full screen map.

The place
Bindu is the last village on the Indian side bordering Bhutan. It is known for its landscape with Jaldhaka River, hills and forests. There is a conjunction of three streams at Bindu. The three streams are known as Bindu Khola, Dudh Pokhri and Jaldhaka that originates from the Kupup lake, a small glacial lake in Sikkim. The combined streams meet at Bindu to form the Jaldhaka river. There is a dam known as Bindu Dam over the Jaldhaka river which is used for controlling water supply to the Jaldhaka Hydel Project at Jhalong and acts as a bridge for crossing over to Bhutan. However, one can cross the dam only by foot. Recently steel bridge construction will be done so that light weight vehicle can pass over.

People
People of different tribes live in this village. Most of the people are engaged in orange and cardamom cultivation, which are exported to other places within India and abroad.

Hydel Project
A total 44 MWe power can be produced if it is subjected to peak flow.

References

Villages in Kalimpong district